The Ekspress is a highly flexible satellite bus designed and manufactured by ISS Reshetnev. It is an unpressurized bus originally designed for GEO, but that has been adapted for medium Earth orbit and to highly elliptical orbit. It has different versions and has been used from civilian communications to satellite navigation.

Platform variations 
The Ekspress bus has two main platforms: the 1000 light to medium version and the 2000, for heavy satellites. There was a project for a third platform, the 4000, but it has not yet been used.

Ekspress-1000 Series 
The Ekspress-1000 in its different variations offers an platform for small to medium satellites. It is designed for directly stacking up to 3 of the smallest version (Ekspress-1000K) or 2 of the bigger ones.

Ekspress-1000K: The smallest platform. It can be stacked up to three Ekspress-1000K.
Ekspress-1000H: The middle platform. It can be dual stacked with Ekspress-1000K or Ekspress-1000H.
Ekspress-1000SH: The biggest platform. It can be dual stacked with an Ekspress-1000K.
Ekspress-1000HT: Evolution of the SH platform.
Ekspress-1000HTA: Evolution of the HT platform.
Ekspress-1000HTV: Evolution of the HTA platform.

Ekspress-2000 Series 
The Ekspress-2000   is the fruits of the collaboration with Thales Alenia Space and their Spacebus 4000 experience with the Ekspress-1000H. It is, as the rest of the family, a direct to GEO bus and given its size it is not designed to be stacked. It has an expected design life of 15 years.

Ekspress-4000 Series 
The Ekspress-4000  is a collaboration with Thales Alenia Space to mix the best elements of the Ekspress-2000 with the Spacebus 4000. This would enable more than 60 transponders of payload.

It would lack any orbit raising propulsion, but would keep the electric propulsion thrusters (SPT-100) supplied by OKB Fakel for station keeping. It would also use the Russian solar panels and have versions designed for highly elliptical orbit like Molniya orbit so important for the northerner regions of Russia.

During 2009, the plan was to start with a series of satellites in HEO orbits for the Russian government, called Ekspress-RV ). It would be a constellation of three on orbit spacecraft with a fourth backup on Earth, but no further development have been communicated. Nor any of the expected foreign sales were closed.

List of satellites 
The Ekspress bus has seen many successes, both for the commercial market and the military programs. Here is a list of all known orders as of July 2016.

See also 

 ISS Reshetnev – The Ekspress bus designer and manufacturer.
 Russian Satellite Communications Company –  The main Russian state operator of communications satellites.
 Ekspress Constellation – Communication satellite family operated by Russian Satellite Communications Company.
 Luch satellite constellation – A Russian relay satellites constellation that enable constant communications with the ISS and Soyuz-MS.
 GLONASS-K – Third generation of the GLONASS navigation satellite that is based on the Ekspress-1000 bus.
 GLONASS-K2 – Evolution of the GLONASS-K based on the Ekspress-1000A bus.

References

External links 
 ISS Reshetnev

+
Satellite buses